The Quiksilver Pro France 2015 was an event of the Association of Surfing Professionals for the 2015 ASP World Tour.

This event was held from 06 to 17 October at Landes forest, (Aquitaine, France) with the participation of 36 surfers.

The tournament was won by Gabriel Medina (BRA), who beat Bede Durbidge (AUS) in the final.

Round 1

Round 2

Round 3

Round 4

Round 5

Quarter finals

Semi finals

Final

References

Quiksilver Pro France
2015 World Surf League
2015 in French sport